In enzymology, a GDP-4-dehydro-D-rhamnose reductase is an enzyme that catalyzes the chemical reaction

GDP-6-deoxy-D-mannose + NAD(P)+  GDP-4-dehydro-6-deoxy-D-mannose + NAD(P)H + H+

The 3 substrates of this enzyme are GDP-6-deoxy-D-mannose, NAD+, and NADP+, whereas its 4 products are GDP-4-dehydro-6-deoxy-D-mannose, NADH, NADPH, and H+.

This enzyme belongs to the family of oxidoreductases, specifically those acting on the CH-OH group of donor with NAD+ or NADP+ as acceptor. The systematic name of this enzyme class is GDP-6-deoxy-D-mannose:NAD(P)+ 4-oxidoreductase. Other names in common use include GDP-4-keto-6-deoxy-D-mannose reductase, GDP-4-keto-D-rhamnose reductase, and guanosine diphosphate-4-keto-D-rhamnose reductase. This enzyme participates in fructose and mannose metabolism.

References

 
 

EC 1.1.1
NADPH-dependent enzymes
NADH-dependent enzymes
Enzymes of unknown structure